Haytham Kajjo (born 23 March 1976 – 16 October 2002) was a Syrian professional footballer who played for Al-Shorta, Al-Jihad and the Syria national team.

Career
Kajjo won the top scorer of the Syrian Premier League twice with Al-Jihad in the 1998–99 and 2000–01 seasons. He died from a road accident on the road to Deir Ezzor.

References

External links

1976 births
2002 deaths
Association football forwards
Syrian footballers
Syria international footballers
Al-Shorta Damascus players
Syrian Kurdish people
Road incident deaths in Syria
Syrian Premier League players